Guiyang Miao, also known as Guiyang Hmong, is a Miao language of China. It is named after Guiyang County, Guizhou, though not all varieties are spoken there. The endonym is Hmong, a name it shares with the Hmong language.

Classification
Guiyang was given as a subgroup of Western Hmongic in Wang (1985). Matisoff (2001) separated the three varieties as distinct Miao languages, not forming a group. Wang (1994) adds another two minor, previously unclassified varieties.

Northern
Southern
Southwestern
Northwestern (Qianxi 黔西)
South-Central (Ziyun 紫云)

Mo Piu, spoken in northern Vietnam, may be a divergent variety of Guiyang Miao.

Representative dialects of Guiyang Miao include:
Baituo 摆托, Huaxi District, Guiyang
Tieshi 铁石, Qianxi County
Zhongba 中坝, Changshun County

References

West Hmongic languages
Languages of China